Jeremy Jones (born January 2, 1975) is an American professional snowboarder. He is known for freestyle snowboarding and jibbing.

Snowboarding career
Jeremy began snowboarding when he was 13 years old. Jeremy is unique because he sets a standard for snowboarding but he does not compete. He was sponsored by, Burton, Anon, Milosport, and Nixon. Jeremy was selected by Peter Line to join Forum Snowboarding, where he became part of the original eight snowboarders of the Forum team. While at Forum he continued to revolutionize freestyle snowboarding.

Physical Stats
Jeremy is 5' 10" tall and weighs 185 pounds. He rides goofy, 15 degrees in the front and negative nine degrees in the back. Jones also stands 24.5" wide.

Movie career
His snowboard movies include Chulcksmack, Decade, Follow Me Around, 91 Words for Snow, From___ With Love, Jibbing with Jeremy Jones, Nixon Jib Fest, Pulse, Shakedown, Technical Difficulties, The Resistance, True Life, Picture This, Its Always Snowing Somewhere, Double Decade, the "B" Movie, and 13. Mack Dawg Movies made him famous worldwide around snowboard fans.

Major injury
On Wednesday January 11, 2017, he had a snowboarding accident in the Utah Backcountry. As a result he suffered multiple broken bones in both of his legs. A GoFundMe: Jeremy Jones Recovery Fund campaign has been set up to help offset his medical bills that are likely to be extremely high.

References

Jones, Jeremy (freestyler)
1976 births
Living people
20th-century American people
21st-century American people